"Don't Walk Away" is a song by American singer Pat Benatar, which was released in 1988 as the second single from her seventh studio album Wide Awake in Dreamland. The song was written by Nick Gilder and Duane Hitchings, and produced by Peter Coleman and Neil Giraldo.

Background
It was Chrysalis' decision to release "Don't Walk Away" as a single from Wide Awake in Dreamland. Benatar told Todd Everett of the King Features Syndicate, "'Don't Walk Away' is so typical of what they'd choose to release."

Music video
The song's music video was directed by Jim Yukich and produced by Paul Flattery. It achieved medium rotation on MTV.

Critical reception
On its release as a single, Billboard described "Don't Walk Away" as "less aggressive" than the preceding single "All Fired Up", and added that "perhaps the nice mesh of Benatar's vocal and the power of this pretty pop track will produce a hit". Barry Young of The Press and Journal gave the single a two out of five star rating and wrote, "Benatar continues to produce ultra-American, drive-in teen rock with little relevance to this side of the Atlantic. Some nice touches here, but mainly typical Benatar."

Track listing
7–inch and cassette single
"Don't Walk Away" – 4:10
"Lift 'em on Up" – 4:54

7–inch single (US promo)
"Don't Walk Away" – 4:10
"Don't Walk Away" – 4:10

12–inch and CD single (UK 12-inch and German 12-inch/CD release)
"Don't Walk Away" – 4:10
"Lift 'em on Up" – 4:54
"Hell Is For Children" (Live Version) – 6:14
"We Live for Love" (Special Mix) – 3:57

Personnel
Don't Walk Away
 Pat Benatar – vocals
 Neil Giraldo – guitar
 Kevin Savigar – keyboards
 Fernando Saunders – bass
 Myron Grombacher – drums
 Frank Linx, Nick Gilder – backing vocals

Production
 Peter Coleman – producer and mixer on "Don't Walk Away" and "Lift 'em on Up"
 Neil Giraldo – producer and mixer (all tracks)
 Frank Linx, Steve Ford, Gil Morales – assistant engineers
 George Marino – mastering

Charts

References

1988 songs
1988 singles
Pat Benatar songs
Songs written by Nick Gilder
Chrysalis Records singles